"Tonight You're Perfect" is a single by New Politics, from their second album A Bad Girl in Harlem.

Charts

References 

2013 singles
2013 songs
New Politics (band) songs
RCA Records singles
Music videos shot in Iceland